Ângela Maria Fernandes Diniz (10 November 1944, Belo Horizonte – 30 December 1976 Armação dos Búzios) was a Brazilian socialite who became famous after she was murdered at her own beach house in Praia dos Ossos, Búzios, Rio de Janeiro by her lover, Raul Fernandes do Amaral Street (commonly known as Doca Street).  The crime received extensive media coverage in Brazil.

Life 
Ângela Diniz married engineer Milton Villas Boas when she was 18, and divorced nine years later after having three children with him. She later dated gossip columnist Ibrahim Sued, starting in 1975—it was her last relationship before dating Doca Street.

In 1975, she was accused of doing and keeping drugs, and, immediately after, kidnapping her own daughter.

In 1976, while spending some time at their beach house in Búzios, Doca and Ângela had an argument, and she threw his briefcase at him. His Beretta pistol tumbled from it, and he picked it up and used it to shoot her dead in a rage.

In the media 

Angela's life was considered for a movie to be directed by Roberto Farias, with Deborah Secco on the lead role, but it was never produced.

Part of her story is told on the book Submundo da sociedade, by Adelaide Carraro.

In 2006, Doca Street published a book called Mea Culpa, in which he explains in detail how he met Angela, how they started an extramarital affair, how he left his wife and children to live with Ângela, and how he killed her.

On 2020, Praia dos Ossos a podcast about the case, was released.

References 

1944 births
1976 deaths
1976 murders in Brazil
Assassinated Brazilian people
Female murder victims
People from Belo Horizonte